Muscular Development is an American fitness and bodybuilding magazine first published in 1964. It was founded by Bob Hoffman.

History
John Grimek was the editor from 1964, until its sale in 1986 to Twinlab. In 2001, Twinlab sold Muscular Development to Steve Blechman who then resigned from Twinlab. Muscular Development is also currently published in Romania.

Muscular Development focuses on bodybuilding and nutrition science. Among its current or past contributors are Anssi H. Manninen (former Senior Science Editor), Michael Colgan, John Romano (former Senior Editor), Dan Duchaine, and Mike Mentzer. It was notable for including an ongoing comic strip, Max Rep: Mr. Astrotitan 2206 by illustrator Lyman Dally in the 90's.  Max Rep was featured on the January, 1991 cover with Sandy Riddell while both he and Quadra Blu appeared together on the fully illustrated November, 1993 cover with Quadra appearing on that issue's poster. After the sale of the magazine to Blechman it changed to a more "hard-core" bodybuilding magazine and focused less on fitness.

See also 
List of female bodybuilders
List of male professional bodybuilders

References

External links
Official Website

Sports magazines published in the United States
Bodybuilding magazines
Fitness magazines
Health magazines
Magazines established in 1964
Magazines published in New York (state)
Monthly magazines published in the United States